The broad-tailed hummingbird (Selasphorus platycercus) is a medium-sized hummingbird species found in highland regions from western United States and Western Canada to Mexico and Guatemala.

Description 

Adults of both sexes show an iridescent green back, white eye ring and a rounded black tail projecting beyond their wing tips, from which their name was inspired. 

This species shows sexual dimorphism, which means that male and female have different characteristics. The male possesses a characteristic bright rose-red gorget. An identification characteristic is the white eye ring. The female can be distinguished from the male by her paler coloration, cinnamon flanks, and spotted cheeks absent in the male.

Taxonomy 
The broad-tailed hummingbird, Selasphorus platycercus, is a member of the order Apodiformes, in the family Trochilidae. Hummingbird taxonomy has not been extensively studied, but its phylogenic division can be divided as a family into nine clades in which the broad-tailed hummingbird is a member of the "Bee group" and included in the Selasphorus genus. This genus is composed of 6 members taxonomically distinguished based on color characteristics. This genus is characterized by hummingbirds with a plumage containing rufous coloration and a neck gorget of orange to purple in males.

Members of this genus include:

Selasphorus sasin : Allen's hummingbird

Selasphorus rufus : Rufous hummingbird

Selasphorus scintilla : Scintillant hummingbird

Selasphorus ardens : Glow-throated hummingbird

Selasphorus flammula :Volcano hummingbird

On a geographic scale, the genus Selasphorus can be subdivided into 2 groups of species, one living in North America, and a second in the region of Costa Rica and Panama.

Habitat and distribution

Habitat

This hummingbird is seen in the understory or under tree canopies of pine and oak woodland. It forages in open areas with flowers or in grasslands among trees and shrubs. Its breeding habitat is mainly in subalpine meadows, foothills, montane valleys, and stands of aspen or spruce.

Distribution

The broad-tailed hummingbird is found from Guatemala to Mexico, and western United States and Western Canada during summer, while wintering regions are mainly in southern Mexico and Guatemala.

Migration

This species exhibits partial migration, depending on the northern range during winter. The specific migratory route used by the broad-tailed hummingbird remains unknown, although migrating populations winter in southern Mexico or Guatemala and return to their breeding area in spring. Males arrive first to the breeding range, followed by breeding females. Some populations of the broad-tailed hummingbird in southern Mexico and Guatemala do not migrate, a variation in behavior called "sedentary".

Behavior

Vocalizations

The broad-tailed hummingbird produces several different sound patterns. This bird's call sounds like a sharp “cheet”, which is repeated “cheet cheet cheet cheet...”. Hummingbird wing beats have also been found to be a communication signal. These birds produce two different types of sound using their wing beat. The first one is a “wing hum” and is simply produced when the hummingbird flies. This type of wing beat has a sound that ranges from 35 to 100 Hz, and both sexes are able to produce it for communication. The second is “wing trills” produced by the male hummingbird during courtship displays. The wing trill produces a buzzing sound and can be heard 50 m away by other males and 75 m away by other females. This sound is produced when air passes rapidly through the 9th and 10th primary feathers. In one experiment, birds without this wing trill lost their territory more easily to more aggressive birds.

Diet

The diet of the broad-tailed hummingbirds consists mainly of insects and nectar of plants that are “hummingbird-flowered”. These types of flower are characterized by high nectar production and red corollas with a tubular shape, such as Aquilegia elegantula.

Reproduction
The range of breeding locations appear to be from central Montana in the north to Guatemala in the south. Although  broad-tailed hummingbirds have been seen in British Columbia, these birds appear to be accidental migrants, with no evidence for breeding at such northern latitudes.

Breeding site 
The broad-tailed hummingbird has a promiscuous mating system and does not form a pair bond. The reproduction time for broad-tailed hummingbirds correlated with the time flower production is at its peak.

Courtship 
Male perform an aerial display to attract females during the breeding season. Males will fly high and dive while producing a trill sound with their wing feathers.

Nest construction 
In 70% of cases, females return to their nest site from one year to the next. Females build their nest alone, without the male help. The overall nest construction may take around 4 to 5 days. The nest has an overall cup shape and is stuck to a tree branch with spider webs, camouflaged by the addition of an external layer of lichen, moss, and tree material. Nest material can be stolen by other females for the construction of a nest.

Brooding 
Nest cup diameter increases as the chicks age. Chicks are altricial at their hatch, and will take around 10 to 12 days for feathering. The female will stay with the fledged young up to  several weeks.

Conservation status 
This species conservation status is “Least Concern ”, indicating it is not an endangered species, having a wide range and moderate  population size, although one survey indicated a 52% decline in population between 1966 and 2015. It appears to be adapted to human-modified habitats.

References

External links
 Broad-tailed hummingbird nest with chicks - Birds of North America
 Broad-tailed hummingbird photo gallery

Selasphorus
Birds of Mexico
Birds of Guatemala
Native birds of the Western United States
Birds of the Great Basin
Birds of the Rio Grande valleys
Hummingbird species of Central America
Birds described in 1827
Taxa named by William John Swainson
Birds of the Sierra Madre Occidental
Birds of the Sierra Madre Oriental
Birds of the Sierra Madre del Sur
Birds of the Trans-Mexican Volcanic Belt